Thomas Clarke (born 2 January 1989) is an English former professional footballer who played as a forward.

Career
As a teenager Clarke grew up playing for his local youth team Okeford United, and it was while representing his county Dorset that he was spotted by Yeovil Town and offered a youth contract. In June 2006, Clarke was awarded his first professional contract with Yeovil along with fellow youth team players Craig Alcock and Jake Smeeton. In February 2007, Clarke along with Alcock joined Southern League Division One South & West side Taunton Town on a month-loan deal making five appearances scoring three times before his return to Yeovil. On 5 May 2007, Clarke was one of three youth team players, along with Alcock and Gavin McCallum, to make their Yeovil debut away at Gillingham in the final regular league game of the 2006–07 with the club having already assured themselves of their place in the end of season play-offs. Clarke started the match and played the opening 57 minutes of the match before being replaced by striker Daniel Webb. At the end of the season, Clarke was awarded a new six-month contract extension. Having started the new season as a regular in the Yeovil reserve team, in September 2007, Clarke joined another Southern League Division One South & West side Bridgwater Town on loan. Clarke was recalled from his loan spell after two months when Yeovil suffered a series of injuries, Clarke returned to Yeovil having scored seven goals in eleven matches in all competitions for Bridgwater. At the end of December 2007, his contract with Yeovil expired having made only one appearance for Yeovil.

After his release from Yeovil, Clarke played in the Conference South having two spells with Dorchester Town, Eastleigh and Bognor Regis Town. Clarke also played for Wimborne Town and while studying at York University, he played semi-professionally for North Ferriby United and Pickering Town.

Personal life
Born in Worthing, Sussex. Clarke grew up in the village of Okeford Fitzpaine, Dorset. After dropping out of professional football, Clarke studied for a degree at the  University of York.

References

External links
 

Living people
1989 births
Sportspeople from Worthing
English footballers
Association football forwards
Yeovil Town F.C. players
Taunton Town F.C. players
Bridgwater Town F.C. players
Dorchester Town F.C. players
Wimborne Town F.C. players
Eastleigh F.C. players
Bognor Regis Town F.C. players
North Ferriby United A.F.C. players
Pickering Town F.C. players
English Football League players
National League (English football) players
Alumni of the University of York